Die Woch ('The Week') was a Yiddish-language weekly newspaper published in Tel Aviv. 

The newspaper was founded on 29 March 1959 as a 12-page tabloid. Die Woch was an organ of Mapai. Y. Magen was the editor. The newspaper was sold for 200 Israeli pruta.

References

1959 establishments in Israel
Yiddish newspapers
Defunct newspapers published in Israel
Mass media in Tel Aviv
Yiddish culture in Tel Aviv
Non-Hebrew-language newspapers published in Israel
Weekly newspapers published in Israel